Nattoralik, old spelling Nagtoralik, is a fjord in the King Frederick VI Coast, Kujalleq municipality, southern Greenland. 

There is a Paleo-Eskimo archaeological site on the northern shore of the fjord.

Geography
Nattoralik is a short fjord lying between the Kangerluaraq to the north and the Nanuuseq fjord to the south. 
It extends in a roughly east–west direction from its mouth in the North Atlantic Ocean for about 8 km until its head.

In the same manner as in the fjords further north, dark-hued mountains rise steeply from the coastline on both sides with heights averaging between 600 and 800 m. 

See also
List of fjords of Greenland

References

External links
Den grønlandske Lods - Geodatastyrelsen
 Ketilidian structure and the rapakivi suite between Lindenow Fjord and Kap Farvel, South-East Greenland
The Ketilidian orogen of South Greenland: geochronology, tectonics, magmatism, and fore-arc accretion during Palaeoproterozoic oblique convergence

Fjords of Greenland